Louis Parrot (28 August 1906 – 24 August 1948) was a French poet, novelist and journalist.

Louis Parrot was born in Tours and came from a family of laborers and artisans. He became an apprentice at 12 years old, first in a bank and then in a library, where he developed a love of books. He wrote his first poems in the early 1920s. The collection of poems « Misery Farm » in 1934 affirm his talent and his vocation as a poet. He went to do literary studies in Spain. He meet a lot of writers and poets including Paul Éluard in Madrid. During the civil war, he returned to France. He joined the staff of the newspaper Ce soir founded by Jean-Richard Bloch and Louis Aragon, and became chief editor in August 1944. During the World War II, he lived in Clermont-Ferrand and his house was a center of the Résistance for intellectuals.  He died in Paris, aged 41.

As well as poetry, he wrote three novels, and several stories and essays of poetic inspiration.

Works
collection of poems
 Ode à Minerve meurtrière
 Tristesse des soirs paisibles
 Cornemuse de l'orage
 Misery farm
 Mystères douloureux
 Œil de fumée

novels
 Le Grenier à Sel
 Nous reviendrons
 La Flamme et la Cendre

stories and essays
 Panorama de la culture espagnole
 Le poète et son image
 Paul Éluard
 L'intelligence en guerre
 Où habite l'oubli
 Federico Garcia Lorca
 Ursule la laide
 Blaise Cendrars
 Paille noire des étables
 Mozart

References

External links
 

Writers from Tours, France
1906 births
1948 deaths
20th-century French poets
French male poets
French Resistance members
20th-century French male writers